The W.H.C. Folsom House is located in Prairie du Chien, Wisconsin.

History
The house was built for W.H.C. Folsom, a Canadian immigrant who was later a member of the Minnesota House of Representatives and the Minnesota State Senate. During the Mexican–American War, Wiram Knowlton, another noted politician, used it as a recruiting location and artist John Muir worked at the house as a printer. In addition, it served as a clubhouse.

The house is one of two historic properties that belonged to Folsom, the other being the Folsom House in Taylors Falls, Minnesota. It was listed on the National Register of Historic Places in 1984 and on the State Register of Historic Places in 1989.

References

Houses on the National Register of Historic Places in Wisconsin
Clubhouses on the National Register of Historic Places in Wisconsin
National Register of Historic Places in Crawford County, Wisconsin
Houses in Crawford County, Wisconsin
Greek Revival architecture in Wisconsin
Brick buildings and structures
Houses completed in 1842